The Nkenda–Mpondwe–Beni High Voltage Power Line is a proposed high voltage electricity power line, connecting the high voltage substation at Nkenda, in Kasese District, in the Western Region of  Uganda, to another high voltage substation at Beni, in North Kivu Province, in the Democratic Republic of the Congo.

Location
The 220kV power line, begins at the substation at Nkenda, in Kasese District, Western Uganda. The line travels in a south-westerly direction through Mpondwe, to  Kasindi, in the Democratic Republic of the Congo. There, it takes a general north-westerly course, to end at Beni, North Kivu Province, in the Democratic Republic of the Congo.

Overview
This power line is planned to transmit electricity to the eastern parts of the Democratic Republic of the Congo, as part the regional power-sharing protocols of the Nile Equatorial Lakes Subsidiary Action Program. Uganda plans to sell electricity to neighboring countries, including the Democratic Republic of the Congo, after Karuma Hydroelectric Power Station and Isimba Hydroelectric Power Station become operational in 2019. The government of the Democratic Republic of the Congo has plans to extend the high-voltage power line to Bunia and Butebo.

Construction
The two governments are in discussions on how to fund the construction of the power line, using loans from the African Development Bank, with each country being responsible for the portion of the line in her territory.

See also
 Bujagali–Tororo–Lessos High Voltage Power Line
 Nkenda–Fort Portal–Hoima High Voltage Power Line
 Masaka–Mutukula–Mwanza High Voltage Power Line
 Kawanda–Birembo High Voltage Power Line

References

External links
Website of the Uganda Electricity Transmission Company Limited

High-voltage transmission lines in Uganda
Energy infrastructure in Africa
Energy in Uganda
Energy in the Democratic Republic of the Congo
High-voltage transmission lines in the Democratic Republic of the Congo
Proposed electric power transmission systems
Proposed electric power infrastructure in Uganda 
Proposed electric power infrastructure in the Democratic Republic of the Congo